Sightings is a New York City-based trio of musicians, operating on the boundaries of rock, noise, and avant-garde sounds. The lineup consists of Mark Morgan on guitar, Richard Hoffman on bass and Jon Lockie on drums. The band debuted with a 7" on the Freedom From label and has since released records through Load Records, Psych-O-Path, Fusetron, Dais Records and Brah Records. "Through The Panama" was produced by Andrew W.K.

Discography

Albums
 Sightings (2002)
 Michigan Haters (2002)
 Absolutes (2003)
 Arrived in Gold (2004)
 End Times (2006)
 Through the Panama (2007)
 City of Straw (2010)
 Future Accidents (2011)
 Michigan Haters (issued on LP) (2011)
 Terribly Well (Dais Records, 2013)
 Amusers and Puzzlers (Dais Records, 2015)

References

External links 
 2002 interview
 band page at Load Records
 review on fakejazz.com
 Stereogum Band to Watch
 Interview from 2013 with Tiny Mix Tapes

American noise rock music groups
Load Records artists